Rok Kopitar (born May 5, 1959 in Celje) is a former Slovenian athlete who placed 5th in the 400 m hurdles final at the 1980 Summer Olympics in Moscow, competing for Yugoslavia. He won a gold medal in the same event at the 1979 Mediterranean Games in Split.

Kopitar's personal best over 400 m hurdles was 49.11 s, set in 1980, and still standing as a Slovenian national record .

References
 Rok Kopitar at Sports Reference
 http://www.oks.org.rs/mi08e.htm

Living people
1959 births
Olympic athletes of Yugoslavia
Slovenian male hurdlers
Athletes (track and field) at the 1980 Summer Olympics
Athletes (track and field) at the 1988 Summer Olympics
Sportspeople from Celje
Yugoslav male hurdlers
Mediterranean Games gold medalists for Yugoslavia
Athletes (track and field) at the 1979 Mediterranean Games
World Athletics Championships athletes for Yugoslavia
Mediterranean Games medalists in athletics